Villefort is a commune in the Lozère department in southern France.

People
Villefort was the birthplace of Odilon Barrot (1791–1873), politician and Prime Minister of France.

See also
 Communes of the Lozère department

References

External links
 
  Regordane Info - The independent portal for The Regordane Way or St Gilles Trail, which passes through Villefort.

Communes of Lozère